The WORMS Award for the Advancement of Women in Operations Research and Management Science is given annually by WORMS, the Forum on Women in OR/MS of the Institute for Operations Research and the Management Sciences, to "a person who has contributed significantly to the advancement and recognition of women in the field of Operations Research and the Management Sciences (OR/MS)".

Recipients
The winners of the WORMS Award have included:

References

Operations research awards
Science awards honoring women